The Bellamonter Rottum is a river in Baden-Württemberg, Germany. At its confluence with the Steinhauser Rottum in Ochsenhausen, the Rottum is formed.

See also
List of rivers of Baden-Württemberg

Rivers of Baden-Württemberg
Rivers of Germany